Tatparanandam Ananda Krishnan (Tamil: த. ஆனந்தகிருஷ்ணன்) (born 1 April 1938) is a Malaysian-Tamil businessman, the Chairman of Usaha Tegas Sdn Bhd and founder of Yu Cai Foundation (YCF). Nicknamed A.K.,  he is estimated to have a net worth of US$5.8 billion according to Forbes latest annual list of wealthiest people, making him the third-wealthiest in Malaysia.

Ananda Krishnan shuns public exposure and is known to maintain a low profile for a person of his stature.

Biography 
Ananda Krishnan was born in 1938 in Brickfields, Kuala Lumpur. Ananda Krishnan has his roots in Jaffna. He studied at Vivekananda Tamil School in Brickfields and furthered his studies at Victoria Institution, Kuala Lumpur. Later, as a Colombo Plan scholar, he attended the University of Melbourne, Australia for his B.A. (Honours) degree majoring in political science. During that time he boarded in the Melbourne suburb of Hawthorn. Following that, Krishnan obtained a Masters in Business Administration from Harvard Business School, graduating in 1964.

Krishnan is a follower of Buddhism.

Krishnan has two daughters and a son who is also a Theravada Buddhist monk known as Ajahn Siripanyo.

Entrepreneurship 
Krishnan's first entrepreneurial venture was a Malaysian consultancy MAI Holdings Sdn Bhd. He set up Exoil Trading, which went on to purchase oil drilling concessions in various countries. Later, he moved into gambling (in Malaysia). In the early part of the 1990s, he started diversifying into the multimedia arena.

Currently, he has business interests in media (Astro), satellite (MEASAT), oil and gas (Bumi Armada, Pexco), telecommunications (Maxis, Sri Lanka Telecom). He owns stakes in Tanjong Public Limited Company, an investment holding company with subsidiaries involved in leisure (TGV Cinemas) and property (67% Maxis Tower etc.).

Multimedia 
Krishnan first came to prominence by helping to organise the Live Aid concert with Bob Geldof in the mid-1980s. In the early 1990s, he began building a multimedia empire that now includes two telecommunication companies—Maxis Communications, MEASAT Broadcast Network Systems and SES World Skies—and has three communication satellites circumnavigating the earth.

He effected the purchase of 46% of Maxis Communications, the country's largest cellular phone company, from América Móvil, AT&T Corporation, British Telecom, Belgacom, Ooredoo, Orange S.A. and Royal KPN N.V. for $1,180 million—raising his stake to 70%. Maxis has more than ten million subscribers, with around 40% market share in Malaysia. He also owns a stake in Sri Lanka Telecom.

In an agreement between Astro and India's Sun Network, Krishnan plans to produce TV channels which cater to the Indian market, especially Tamil people in countries such as US, Western Europe and the Middle East. He also plans to offer TV services featuring Web-based interactivity. Ananda Krishnan owns stakes in TVB.com and the Shaw Brothers movie archives.

Philanthropy 
Ananda Krishnan donates to education, the arts, sports and humanitarian causes in Malaysia through his company Usaha Tegas, and its subsidiaries.

In 2003 Krishnan's Usaha Tegas launched the Harapan Nusantara education fund. Since 2004 the fund has sponsored 100 students a year to attend special programs at local private universities that collaborate with foreign universities. In the same year the company also started the Yu Cai Education Foundation with a grant of $6.6 million to help ethnic Chinese groups.

In 2006 Ananda Krishnan's media company Astro introduced its scholarship program, promising to devote an annual RM2 million to support promising Malaysian undergraduate and graduate students studying media and broadcasting.

In 2008 he contributed to the opening of the Montfort Girls Centre to help orphaned and underprivileged girls develop their vocational skills.

In 2010 Krishnan was featured on the Forbes list of 48 Heroes of Philanthropy.

In January 2015 Ananda Krishnan and the Usaha Tegas Group launched the Yu Cai Foundation (YCF). YCF provides student scholarships for Mandarin-based schools and grants to educational institutions which promote the study of vernacular languages, especially Mandarin and English.

See also 
 List of Tamil businesspeople

References

External links 
 "Usaha Tegas Group: Impacting lives"
 Forbes List of Billionaires
 Malaysian billionaire Ananda Krishnan bails out Johnston Press
 Malaysia and Singapore: Asian Nations of Economic Success by Globalization
 Malaysian Tycoon Ananda Krishnan reaps £120m from sale of Excel
 Ananda Krishnan
 T. Ananda Krishnan

1938 births
Harvard Business School alumni
Malaysian Buddhists
Malaysian businesspeople
Malaysian chairpersons of corporations
Malaysian people of Sri Lankan Tamil descent
Tamil businesspeople
American people of Indian descent
American businesspeople
University of Melbourne alumni
People educated at Trinity College (University of Melbourne)
Living people
Sri Lankan Tamil businesspeople
Malaysian billionaires
Tamil billionaires
Malaysian people of Indian descent